"Blood on the Risers" is an American paratrooper song from World War II. It is associated with all current American airborne units, including the 82nd Airborne Division, the 173rd Airborne Brigade and 4th Brigade Combat Team (Airborne) of the 25th Infantry Division, and the 120th CTS (United States) as well as British airborne units. It is known as "Mancha Roja" (Spanish for "Red Stain") in airborne units from multiple Latin American countries. In Spain it is called "Sangre en las cuerdas" ("Blood upon the risers" in English).

This song has been featured in the television miniseries Band of Brothers, the television series Preacher, and the video game Brothers in Arms: Road to Hill 30. It was also mentioned in Donald Burgett's book Currahee!: A Screaming Eagle at Normandy. Sung to the tune of "The Battle Hymn of the Republic", the song tells of a fatal training jump of a rookie paratrooper whose parachute fails to deploy, resulting in him falling to his death. Each verse describes the man’s death and the subsequent condition of his body in the aftermath.

The song is a cautionary tale on the dangers of improper preparation of a parachute jump. The protagonist does everything right but forgets to hook up his static line which would automatically deploy his main parachute. Upon discovering this error during the jump, he deploys his reserve chute in bad falling position with disastrous results, as he becomes entangled in the parachute’s canopy and risers and falls uncontrollably to the ground below. As the reserve chute is stored in a belly bag on the World War II-era rig, deploying it in a bad falling position could easily lead to an accident, not unlike the one described in the song. "Risers" are the four straps that connect the suspension lines of the parachute canopy to the parachute harness.

References

External links
Blood on the Risers
Men of Easy Company's official lyrics, archived from the original

American military marches
Songs about the military
Songs of World War II
1943 songs